Dongling may refer to:

Eastern Qing tombs, or Dongling of Hebei
Fuling Tomb, also known as Eastern Tomb (Dongling), Shenyang
Hunnan District, formerly Dongling (named after Eastern Tomb), Shenyang, China
Dongling, Hui'an County (东岭镇), town in Hui'an County, Fujian, China
Dongling Group (东岭集团)
Dongling Vibration (东菱振动), Chinese manufacturing company

See also 
Donglin (disambiguation)